This list is of the Historic Sites of Japan located within the Prefecture of Toyama.

National Historic Sites
As of 1 August 2019, twenty-one Sites have been designated as being of national significance, including the Kaga Domain Maeda Clan Graves and Kaetsu border castle ruins, which span the prefectural borders with Ishikawa.

|-
|}

Prefectural Historic Sites
As of 1 May 2019, thirty Sites have been designated as being of prefectural importance.

Municipal Historic Sites
As of 1 May 2019, a further one hundred and eighty-five Sites have been designated as being of municipal importance.

Registered Historic Sites
As of 1 July 2019, one Monument has been registered (as opposed to designated) as an Historic Site at a national level.

See also

 Cultural Property (Japan)
 Etchū Province
 List of Places of Scenic Beauty of Japan (Toyama)
 List of Cultural Properties of Japan - historical materials (Toyama)
 List of Cultural Properties of Japan - paintings (Toyama)

References

External links
 Historic Sites of Toyama Prefecture 

Toyama Prefecture
 Toyama